The Grand Avenue Project is currently under development in the Bunker Hill neighborhood of Downtown Los Angeles along Grand Avenue. The project consists of a revitalization of Grand Park and surrounding lots administered by the Grand Avenue Authority, a joint powers authority consisting of Los Angeles County and City. The first project was the  Grand Park in 2012. It is currently constructing a two-tower complex on the southeast corner of Grand Avenue and 1st Street, designed by Frank Gehry.

History
On February 14, 2007 both the Los Angeles City Council and the Los Angeles County Board of Supervisors approved the project, and officials originally hoped to break ground in December 2007. The project has been developed in stages due to the recession between 2007–2009. On July 26, 2012, Grand Park opened to the public as the initial phase of the project, In October 2014, The Related Companies completed The Emerson, a 19-story tower marketed to older adults that includes an affordable housing component. The Broad, a contemporary art museum, opened between the Disney Concert Hall and the condo tower in 2015. The final phase of the project, on a lot directly east of the Disney Concert Hall, has two skyscrapers, a 45-story residential tower and a 25-story tower featuring apartments and the Conrad Hotel. The development was designed by Frank Gehry. Construction began in December 2018 and is expected to be complete by the end of 2022.

Design 
The park was designed to be pedestrian friendly and connects Bunker Hill to the Civic Center. The park includes tree-shaded sidewalks, fountains, plenty of street lights, benches, and kiosks to encourage walking and exploration of the area, which was designed to encourage residents and visitors to enjoy a family-friendly green space in downtown Los Angeles with musical events and other park activities. The project also included a redevelopment of the Music Center Plaza, the Broad Museum designed by Diller Scofidio + Renfro, and a redevelopment and refurbishment of the Los Angeles Music Center plaza. Two towers were built across from the Disney Concert Hall, designed by architect Frank Gehry as part of the Grand LA. The towers have since been named The Grand by Gehry residences and the Conrad Los Angeles hotel.

References

External links

Bunker Hill, Los Angeles
Frank Gehry buildings
Proposed buildings and structures in California
Buildings and structures in Downtown Los Angeles
Civic Center, Los Angeles
21st century in Los Angeles
Proposed skyscrapers in the United States
Residential condominiums in the United States
Residential skyscrapers in Los Angeles
Buildings and structures under construction in the United States